Frades may refer to:

 Frades, A Coruña, municipality in Galicia, A Coruña, Spain
 Frades de la Sierra, municipality in Castile and León, Spain
 Oliveira de Frades, municipality in Portugal
 Frades, Portugal, parish in the municipality of Póvoa de Lanhoso
 Frades River (disambiguation), name of two rivers in Brasil.